Marius Alexandru Ologu (born 16 July 1989) is a Romanian footballer who plays as a midfielder for Lye Town.

External links 
 
 
 
 

1989 births
Living people
Sportspeople from Craiova
Romanian footballers
FC U Craiova 1948 players
FC Astra Giurgiu players
CS Turnu Severin players
CS Național Sebiș players
Liga I players
Association football midfielders